From May 2, 2009, the French singer Mylène Farmer began a tour through France, Belgium, Switzerland and Russia. It was her fifth tour and supported her seventh studio album Point de suture. For the first time, this tour lead the singer through stadiums and, unlike her 2006 tour, featured a transportable stage.

Background
Since the announcement of Farmer's seventh studio album, the media said that a tour was scheduled for 2009 to support this album.

About this new series of concerts, Farmer explained in an interview: "I am back on stage because I'm bored. I need to reinvent my life. (...) I want to feel dizzy again." She announced that the tour will be carried out throughout France and that the show will be grandiose.

A concert at the Stade de France, Saint-Denis, was first announced for September 12, 2009 (which is also the singer's date of birthday), then another concert on September 4 at the stadium of Geneva. Tickets for both concerts were put on sale from March 28, 2008. A second concert at the Stade de France, for September 11 was later announced on March 29 and the tickets were put on sale from April 1, 2008. In April, a concert was added in Brussels for September 19. Other concerts are announced in the media at present, such as Bordeaux, but are not officially confirmed. In Paris Match, Farmer confirmed the tour would go to Russia in 2009, and additional dates in Ukraine and Latvia are rumoured. A concert at the Bollaert stadium in Lens was announced as being official   then was denied in the media, but the final decision, the cancellation, that should have been known on May 14, was published on May 21, 2008. On May 15, four concerts were officially announced: two in Nantes and two in Rouen for May 2009. The following day, the record label Polydor confirmed them and added eleven dates scheduled in various cities (Nice, Clermont-Ferrand, Marseille, Toulouse, Nantes, Rouen, Strasbourg, Dijon, Lyon). On May 23, three new dates were added : May 6 (Clermont-Ferrand), May 26 (Nantes) and June 9, (Dijon). On November 30, fours concerts in Russia were announced in the Russian media, then on January 26, 2009, one concert in Amnéville.

In February 2009 Farmer's tour producers TS3 cancelled the Eastern European tour dates without giving any explanation. However, there had been rumours for months that the local producers were facing economic problems. At the same time new concerts were announced for June 28 in Saint Petersburg and July 1 in Moscow, organised by different local partners. For the concert in Geneva, the technical problems relating to the enormity of the structures have been resolved (the stadium of Geneva has a smaller capacity than the Stade de France, Saint-Denis). Various media revealed that the stage should have been made out of glass, installed more than three metres above the ground. However, these details about stage design were denied by her creative producer Thierry Suc. He also explained that there will be some differences between shows in stadiums and those in hall. Jean-Paul Gaultier confirmed to be the fashion designer for this tour. It was also announced that the entire show will be filmed "with very sophisticated means of the tridimensional cinema".

Farmer did the rehearsals in Nice a few days before the beginning of her concert tour. The concerts in stadiums were announced as different as the others, because the stage was bigger and there was additional material.

Controversy
The poster of the tour, first revealed on the Internet and then shown in Paris, generated a controversy. Indeed, on this poster, Farmer is lying on the ground, with distraught eyes, as if she had been thrown through a window. As a result, some media criticized this poster, that might suggest a suicide. Other media believed that it refers to a murder or a rape, or perhaps a message of farewell from the singer to her public. Others saw it as a promotional strategy. It was the subject of debate among Farmer's fans and critics on the Internet.

Commercial success
A huge rush took place on sites purchasing tickets, such as Fnac, with over 25,000 connections per minute. Some angry Internet users expressed their dissatisfaction about this problem. The same thing happened on April 1 for the second concert at the Stade de France. According to Michael Drieberg, the director of Live Music, the concert at Geneva is the most quickly sold of all time in Switzerland.

The concert of September 12 (80,000 places) was sold out in two hours only. To date, it is a record. About 17,000 tickets were sold in two hours for the first concert in Geneva, which is also a record, and this show (34,000 places) was more or less sold out after one week. The second concert at the Stade de France was sold out in a very short time (one hour and a quarter) which is a record. For the concert scheduled in Brussels, many people slept in the street, in front of the stores selling the tickets to be sure to get a place. Therefore, 30,000 tickets were also sold quickly. For the concert at the Palais Nikaia, the Fnac store has been raided by the fans before the opening hours, on May 23, and ⅔ of the tickets were sold on the day. The same day, the first two concerts in Nantes were announced as sold out. On May 26, the concerts in Marseille were almost sold out and, according to the French newspaper La Provence, the shows could yield about 9.5 million euros. On 27 May, Universal Music published a press release about exceptional sales of tickets for the concert : 100,000 places sold in one day on Friday, May 23, 2008, which is a record.

Many tickets were sold extremely expensive through unofficial ways. As a result, many disgruntled fans signed a petition on the Internet to denounce these abuses. In Switzerland, Farmer established a new record, selling over 58,000 places.

Finally, on the stage, there were two enormous skeletons inspired by Transit, a sculpture of the 15th century, a central staircase, and some naked models (which look like the doll on the album cover) placed in a library, and orange was the predominant color. Six autobuses for the 120 technicians, twenty semi-trailers of 38 tons, 380 light sources, 300 kilo watt of electric power and a giant screen were used for each performance.

Critical reception
The show received mostly universally positive reviews from critics. Nice Matin qualified the show as "both grandiose and precise, but also full of emotion and shared pleasure". La Montagne and Le Parisien stated : "An impressive set design, a profusion of lights, screens, guitars, dances (...). One heck of a spectacle", "what a raging show !". According to La Provence, many fans were very satisfied by the concert and found it "grandiose". France Soir noted : "The design is detailed, ghostly, bathed in darkness and gigantism, supported by polished visual effects and amazing lightings". Coop said Farmer showed a "nive energy and an undeniable charisma". For Télé Moustique, the a concert in Douai was neat, but some choreographies were disappointing. About the concerts in Belgium, Le Soir concluded: "Nothing to do: Mylène remains irresistible", while La Dernière Heure found the show boring. Nord Éclair deemed the show as "ambitious, impressive, extremely precise and visually amazing".

The concerts in Geneva received generally positive reviews and a few criticism. Farmer "has bewitched her fans in a show perfectly staged" (Le Matin Dimanche), "the star offered a perfect show in every way" (20 Minutes), but with "a catastrophic sound system, an extremely predictable, little dynamic, little intimist singer. Her staff is little emphasized" (Actualité française).

Set list

 General
Anatomic act
 "D'entre les morts" (Intro)
 "Paradis inanimé"
 "L'Âme-stram-gram"
 "Je m'ennuie"
Red glitter act
 Intro + "Appelle mon numéro"
 "XXL"
 "À quoi je sers..."
 "Pourvu qu'elles soient douces"
Ballads act
 "Point de Suture"
 "Nous souviendrons-nous"
 "Rêver"
 "Ainsi soit je..."
 "Interlude: Avant que l'ombre..."
Black vs White act
 "Libertine"
 "Sans contrefaçon"
 "Je te rends ton amour"
X-Ray act
 "Dégénération"
 "Désenchantée"
 "C'est dans l'air"
Final
 "Si j'avais au moins..."

 Russia only
Anatomic act
 "D'entre les morts" (Intro)
 "Paradis inanimé"
 "L'Âme-stram-gram"
 "Je m'ennuie"
Red Glitter act
 Intro + "Appelle mon numéro"
 "XXL"
 "L'amour n'est rien...
 "Pourvu qu'elles soient douces"
Ballads act
 "Point de Suture"
 "Rêver"
 "Ainsi soit je..."
 "Interlude: Avant que l'ombre..."
Black vs White act
 "Libertine"
 "Sans contrefaçon"
 "Je t'aime mélancolie" (only performed in Saint Petersburg)
 "Fuck Them All"
X-Ray act
 "Dégénération"
 "Désenchantée"
 "C'est dans l'air"
Final
 "Si j'avais au moins..."

 Setlist in stadiums
Anatomic act
 "D'entre les morts" (Intro)
 "Paradis inanimé"
 "L'Âme-stram-gram"
 "Je m'ennuie" + Outro
Red Glitter act
  "Appelle mon numéro"
 "XXL"
 "California"
 "Pourvu qu'elles soient douces"
Ballads act
  "Point de Suture"
 "Nous souviendrons-nous"
 "Rêver"
 "Laisse le vent emporter tout"
 "Ainsi soit je..."
 "Interlude: Avant que l'ombre..." (Long)
Black vs White act
  "Libertine"
 "Sans contrefaçon"
 "L'Instant X"
 "Fuck Them All"
X-Ray act
  "Dégénération"
 "C'est dans l'air"
 "Désenchantée"

Tour dates

Content

Indoor concerts

Outdoor concerts

External links
 Toute l'actualité de Mylène Farmer en Français
 Mylène Farmer Tour 2009, mylene.net
 Mylène Farmer Tournee 2009 in German and English Language

References

2009 concert tours
Mylène Farmer concert tours